The 2014 China League One is the 11th season of the China League One, the second tier of the Chinese football league pyramid, since its establishment in 2004.

Teams

Team changes

To League One 

Teams relegated from 2013 Chinese Super League
 Qingdao Jonoon
 Wuhan Zall

Teams promoted from 2013 China League Two
 Qingdao Hainiu 
 Hebei Zhongji

From League One 
Teams promoted to 2014 Chinese Super League
 Henan Jianye
 Harbin Yiteng

Teams relegated to 2014 China League Two
 Chongqing F.C.
 Guizhou Zhicheng

Name changes 
 Chengdu Blades changed their name to Chengdu Tiancheng in December 2013.  
 Shenyang Shenbei changed their name to Shenyang Zhongze in January 2014. 
 Yanbian Changbai Tiger changed their name to Yanbian Changbaishan in February 2014.
 Hubei China-Kyle moved to the city of Ürümqi and changed their name to Xinjiang Tianshan Leopard in February 2014.
 Shijiazhuang Yongchang Junhao changed their name to Shijiazhuang Yongchang in February 2014.

Clubs

Stadiums and Locations

Managerial changes

Foreign players
Restricting the number of foreign players strictly to three per CL1 team.
A team could use three foreign players on the field each game. Players came from Hong Kong, Macau and Chinese Taipei were deemed as native players in CL1.

 Foreign players who left their clubs after first half of the season.

Hong Kong/Macau/Taiwan players (doesn't count on the foreign player slot)

League table

Results

Positions by round

Top scorers

{| class="wikitable"
|-
!Rank
!Player
!Club
!Total
|-
!rowspan=1|
| Guto  
|Chongqing Lifan
|
|-
!rowspan=3|
| Wang Dong
|Chongqing Lifan
|
|-
| Johnny Woodly
|Xinjiang Tianshan Leopard
|
|-
| Babacar Gueye
|Shenzhen Ruby
|
|-
!rowspan=2|
| Li Xiang 
|Beijing BIT
|
|-
| Luis Carlos Cabezas 
|Hunan Billows
|
|-
!rowspan=2|
| Brice Jovial
|Chengdu Tiancheng
|
|-
| Andrés Márquez
|Hebei Zhongji
|
|-
!rowspan=1|
| Felipe Félix 
|Beijing Baxy
|
|-
!rowspan=1|
| Sergio Leal
|Wuhan Zall
|
|-

Awards
The awards of 2014 China League One were announced on 21 December 2014.
 Most valuable player:  Wang Dong (Chongqing Lifan)
 Top scorer:  Guto   (Chongqing Lifan)
 Best goalkeeper:  Wang Guoming (Shijiazhuang Yongchang)
 Best coach:  Goran Tomić (Beijing Baxy)

League Attendance

†

†

References

External links 
  
China League One at sina.com 
China League One at sohu.com 

China League One seasons
2
China
China